Louisville Public Library may refer to:

Louisville Public Library, a branch of the Jefferson County Library System, in Georgia (U.S. state)
Louisville Free Public Library, in Louisville, Kentucky
Louisville Free Public Library, Main Branch, in Louisville, Kentucky
Louisville Free Public Library, Crescent Hill Branch, in Louisville, Kentucky
Louisville Free Public Library, Western Branch, in Louisville, Kentucky
Louisville Public Library, in Louisville, Ohio